Claeissens, also spelled Claessens or Claeissins is a Dutch language surname. It may refer to:

Antoon Claeissens  (c.1536–1613), a Flemish painter
Gillis Claeissens (1526–1605), a Flemish painter
Pieter Claeissens the Elder ((1500–1576), a Flemish painter
Pieter Claeissens the Younger (c. 1535–1623), a Flemish painter

Claeissenss
Dutch-language surnames